Charles John Colville, 1st Viscount Colville of Culross,  (23 November 1818 – 1 July 1903), known as The Lord Colville of Culross between 1849 and 1902, was a British nobleman, Conservative politician and courtier.

Background and education
Colville was the son of General the Honourable Sir Charles Colville and the grandson of John Colville, 8th Lord Colville of Culross. He was educated at Harrow.

Career
Colville served as a captain in the 11th Hussars. He succeeded his uncle in the lordship of Colville of Culross 1849 and was elected a Scottish Representative Peer in 1851. He served under Lord Derby as Chief Equerry and Clerk Marshal from February to December 1852 and again from 1858 to 1859 and under Derby and subsequently Benjamin Disraeli as Master of the Buckhounds from 1866 to 1868. In 1866 he was sworn of the Privy Council. He was later Lord Chamberlain to the Princess of Wales from 1873 to 1901 and was appointed in the same capacity to her as Queen Alexandra from 1901 to 1903.

Colville was also Chairman of the Great Northern Railway Company from 1872 to 1895, a director of the Central London Railway at its opening in 1900 and President of the Honourable Artillery Company. He was made a Knight of the Thistle in 1874 and created Baron Colville of Culross, in the County of Perth, in 1885, in the Peerage of the United Kingdom. In 1902 he was further honoured with a Viscountcy in the Coronation Honours list, when he was made Viscount Colville of Culross, in the County of Perth, on 15 July 1902.

Family
Lord Colville of Culross married the Honourable Cecile Catherine Mary Carrington, eldest daughter of Robert Carrington, 2nd Baron Carrington, in 1853. Their second son was Sir Stanley Colville, who rose to prominence as a Navy officer. Another son, George, was the father of Sir Jock Colville, civil servant and memoirist. Lord Colville of Culross died in July 1903, aged 84, and was succeeded by his eldest son, Charles.

References

External links

|-

1818 births
1903 deaths
English courtiers
Charles
Conservative Party (UK) Baronesses- and Lords-in-Waiting
Knights of the Thistle
Knights Grand Cross of the Royal Victorian Order
Viscounts in the Peerage of the United Kingdom
Members of the Privy Council of the United Kingdom
11th Hussars officers
Scottish representative peers
Masters of the Buckhounds
Peers of the United Kingdom created by Queen Victoria
Peers created by Edward VII
People educated at Harrow School